Jerry Stalcup (born November 19, 1938) is a former linebacker in the National Football League. Stalcup was drafted in the sixth round of the 1960 NFL Draft by the Los Angeles Rams and played that season with the team. He was later drafted in the 1961 NFL Expansion Draft by the Minnesota Vikings, but instead went on to play two seasons with the Denver Broncos of the American Football League. In 1965, he returned to his high school in Rockford to serve as the defensive coordinator. In 1974, he and head Coach Robert Pellant led Rockford East to a state championship in the first year the high school football playoffs were held in Illinois.

References

Sportspeople from Rockford, Illinois
Los Angeles Rams players
Denver Broncos (AFL) players
American football linebackers
Wisconsin Badgers football players
1938 births
Living people